Gordon Williamson (born 1951) is a military history writer and author based in the United Kingdom. Williamson spent seven years with the Military Police in the British Territorial Army and, as of 2016, resides in Scotland. Williamson has written more than 70 books and other publications. Williamson's works focus primarily on German military forces during the Second World War.

Williamson has worked with several publishers, but is perhaps best known for his continuing partnership with Osprey Publishing, with whom he has produced over 40 books.

Selected works
U-boats of the Kaiser's Navy
E-BOAT vs. MTB: The English Channel 1941-45
German Commanders of World War II (2): Waffen-SS, Luftwaffe and Navy
Knight's Cross with Diamonds Recipients: 1941-45
Grey Wolf: U-Boat Crewman of World War II
The Iron Cross 
 Osprey Men-at-Arms 434, World War II German Police Units
Kriegsmarine U-boats 1939-45
Loyalty Is My Honor: Waffen-SS Soldiers Talking
The SS: Hitler's Instrument of Terror
Waffen-SS Handbook 
World War II German Battle Insignia
Torpedo Los!: The Fascinating World of U-boat Collectibles

References 

1951 births
Living people
Place of birth missing (living people)
British writers
Scottish military writers
Royal Military Police soldiers